Conchobar ua nDiarmata, Noble of Connacht and foster-son to Ruaidrí Ua Conchobair, died 1189.

Annalistic references

From the Annals of the Four Masters:

 1183 - Bec O'Hara, Lord of Leyny in Connaught, was treacherously slain by Conor, the grandson of Dermot, who was son of Roderic, in his own house, on Lough Mac Farry.
 1189 - Conor, grandson of Dermot, was slain by Cathal Carragh, the son of Conor Moinmoy, in revenge of the death of his father.
 1227 - Brian, the son of Conor O'Diarmada, was slain.

References

 Ua Conchobair, Cathal Carrach, Ailbhe Mac Shamhrain, in Dictionary of Irish Biography ... to the year 2002: Volume 9, Staines - Z, p. 569. Cambridge, 2010.

12th-century deaths
12th-century births
1189 deaths
People from County Galway
Medieval Gaels from Ireland
12th-century Irish people
O'Conor dynasty